Silvia Puppo Gastélum (born 23 November 1956) is a Mexican politician from the Party of the Democratic Revolution. From 2010 to 2012 she served as Deputy of the LXI Legislature of the Mexican Congress representing Baja California Sur.

References

1956 births
Living people
Politicians from Baja California Sur
Women members of the Chamber of Deputies (Mexico)
Party of the Democratic Revolution politicians
21st-century Mexican politicians
21st-century Mexican women politicians
People from San José del Cabo
Deputies of the LXI Legislature of Mexico
Members of the Chamber of Deputies (Mexico) for Baja California Sur